Nils Jan Gründer (born 23 May 1997) is a German politician of the Free Democratic Party (FDP) who has been serving as a member of the German Bundestag since 2022.

Early life 
Gründer was born in Nuremberg.

Political career 
In the 2021 German federal election, Gründer contested Amberg and ranked 15th on the state list and initially failed to make it into the Bundestag. He was the first successor on the FDP state list and therefore replaced Thomas Sattelberger in the Bundestag on 2 August 2022. There he is the youngest MP of his group.

In parliament, Gründer has since been serving on the Defence Committee, the Committee on the Environment, Nature Conservation, Nuclear Safety and Consumer Protection, and the Parliamentary Advisory Board for Sustainable Development.

References

See also 
List of members of the 20th Bundestag

1997 births

Living people
Members of the Bundestag for Bavaria
Members of the Bundestag for the Free Democratic Party (Germany)
Members of the Bundestag 2021–2025
21st-century German politicians
People from Nuremberg
University of Göttingen alumni